Albert Blount (8 August 1889 – 10 November 1961) was an English cricketer who played first-class cricket for  Derbyshire in 1912 and 1926.

Blount was born at Morton, Derbyshire. He made his debut for Derbyshire in the 1912 season in May against the South Africans  when he took a wicket and was twice not out. He played a total of five matches by the middle of June and had his best bowling performance of 4 for 53 against Sussex . After a 14-year gap, he reappeared for Derbyshire in the 1926 season and played two matches that year making his top score of 17 in his last game which was against Northamptonshire.

Blount was a right-hand batsman and played 11 innings in 7 first-class matches with an average of 5.77 and a top score of 17. He was a  slow left-arm orthodox bowler and took 7 first-class wickets at an average of 30.71 and a best performance of 4 for 53.

Blount died at New Rossington, Yorkshire at the age of 72.

References

1889 births
1961 deaths
Derbyshire cricketers
English cricketers
People from North East Derbyshire District
Cricketers from Derbyshire